Alpinia caerulea, commonly known as native ginger or in the case of the subspecies from the Atherton Tableland red back ginger, is an understorey perennial herb to 3 m, growing under rainforest, gallery forest and wet sclerophyll forest canopy in eastern Australia.

Leaves are up to 40 cm long and 3–10 cm wide. The inflorescence is 10–30 cm long. The blue capsule is globose 1 cm across, with a brittle outer covering containing black seed and white pulp.

Uses

The white pulp of native ginger has a sour flavour, used to activate salivary glands to moisten the mouth when bushwalking, with the seeds usually being discarded. The capsules can also be used as a flavouring spice, using the whole fruit and seed dried and ground. They can also be used to impart a sour flavour and red color in herbal teas.
 
The centers of new shoots have mild gingery flavour, and are excellent in various dishes as a ginger substitute. The roots can also be used in cooking, and have a more earthy resinous flavour.

See also

List of Australian herbs and spices

References

caerulea
Flora of New South Wales
Flora of Queensland
Commelinids of Australia
Bushfood
Spices
Taxa named by George Bentham
Taxa named by Robert Brown (botanist, born 1773)